Melanophilini is a tribe of metallic wood-boring beetles in the family Buprestidae. There are at least 4 genera and 20 described species in Melanophilini.

Genera
 Juniperella Knull, 1947
 Melanophila Eschscholtz, 1829
 Phaenops Dejean, 1833
 Xenomelanophila Sloop, 1937

References

Further reading

 
 
 
 
 

Buprestidae